Kwinana Town Centre is a suburb of the City of Kwinana in the outer southern suburbs of Perth, Western Australia.

The suburb comprises three large city blocks and houses the "Kwinana Marketplace" formerly the "Kwinana Hub" shopping centre, the Kwinana Recreation centre, Kwinana Aquatic Centre, the Kwinana Police Station and the City of Kwinana Council Chambers. Adjacent to the Council Chambers is the Koorliny Arts Centre. One block of land is occupied only by natural bushland.

References

Suburbs of Perth, Western Australia
Suburbs in the City of Kwinana